Skin Deep is an album by American jazz drummer Louis Bellson featuring performances recorded in 1953 and 1954 for the Norgran label. The tracks were first released on the 10 inch LP's The Amazing Artistry of Louis Bellson and The Exciting Mr. Bellson.

Reception
The Allmusic review awarded the album 3 stars stating: "Louis Bellson has long been acknowledged as one of the greatest drummers in jazz history and this release combines two separate sessions that are predominantly features for his incredible solos".

Track listing
All compositions by Louis Bellson except as indicated
 "Skin Deep" - 7:52
 "Claxton Hall Swing" - 2:59 	
 "Phalanges" (Clark Terry, Louis Bellson) - 3:18
 "For Europeans Only" (Tadd Dameron, Don Redman) - 3:03
 "Copasetic" (Ralph Martin, Don Elliott) - 4:56
 "Fascinating Rhythm" (George Gershwin, Ira Gershwin) - 4:16
 "Percussionistically Speaking" - 7:58 	
 "All God's Chillun Got Rhythm" (Walter Jurmann, Gus Kahn, Bronisław Kaper) - 2:55
 "Loris" (Joe Puma) - 3:57
 "A Pearl for Louie" (Ralph Martin) - 3:54
Recorded in Los Angeles CA in July 1953 (tracks 1-4) and New York City in February 1954 (tracks 5-10)

Personnel
Louis Bellson – drums
Harry Edison, Maynard Ferguson, Conrad Gozzo, Ray Linn - trumpet (tracks 1-4)
Don Elliott - trumpet, mellophone, vibraphone, bongos (tracks 5-10)
Hoyt Bohannon, Herb Harper, Tommy Pederson - trombone (tracks 1-4)
Benny Carter, Willie Smith – alto saxophone (tracks 1-4)
Wardell Gray, Bumps Myers – tenor saxophone (tracks 1-4)
Bob Lawson - baritone saxophone (tracks 1-4)
Ralph Martin (tracks 5-10), Jimmy Rowles (tracks 1-4) - piano
Barney Kessel (tracks 1-4), Joe Puma (tracks 5-10) - guitar
Bob Peterson (tracks 5-10), John Simmons (tracks 1-4) – bass

References

Verve Records albums
Norgran Records albums
Louie Bellson albums
1955 albums
Albums produced by Norman Granz